Malinee Kongtan (born ) is a retired Thai female volleyball player.

She was part of the Thailand women's national volleyball team at the 1998 FIVB Volleyball Women's World Championship in Japan.

References

1973 births
Living people
Malinee Kongtan
Place of birth missing (living people)
Malinee Kongtan
Malinee Kongtan